The following is a list of episodes of South Korean reality-variety show The Return of Superman, which was used to be part of a segment of Happy Sunday. It was first aired on September 19, 2013. As of  April 18, 2021, 378 episodes of The Return of Superman have been aired.

Pilot
The original 3 episodes pilot aired as a Chuseok holiday.

2013

2014

2015

2016

2017

2018

2019

2020

2021

2022

: Episodes were not aired on April 20 and 27 due to the Sewol Ferry tragedy in South Korea. 
: Episode 49 was not broadcast on October 19, 2014, due to the live broadcast of the "2014 Professional Baseball Semi-Playoffs" games.
: Episode broadcasts from September 17 to September 24 were replaced with special episodes due to KBS' strike.
: Episode broadcasts from November 19 to December 24 were replaced with special episodes due to KBS' continued strike earlier in the year.
: Episode 213 was not broadcast on February 11, 2018, due to KBS' coverage of the 2018 Winter Olympics in Pyeongchang.

References 

Lists of variety television series episodes
Lists of South Korean television series episodes